Khwaja Sabir or Khan-i-Dauran was viceroy of the Deccan and one of the Mughal emperor Shah Jahan’s leading sardars. He received the title "Khan Dauran" during the conquest of Daulatabad. He died in 1645 from a knife wound.

Career
The real name of Khan Duran was Khwaja Sabir. He was the son of Khwaja Hisari, a member of the Naqshbandi order. The Mughal emperor Jahangir made him an officer of high rank and sent him to the Deccan. Khan Khanan, the famous poet, finding him a youth of enterprising spirit, strived to give him the necessary training. But finding the work unpleasant, Sabir left Khan Khanan and entered the service of the Nizam Shahis. He gained the position of Aide-de-camp through his friend at the Nizam Shahi court and received the title of "Shahnawaz Khan". However, he did not remain for long here as well, abhorring his work and resigned.

Service under the Mughals
Returning to Mughal territory, he got employment as a personal attendant of Prince Khurram, who gave him the title "Nasiri Khan". He served Shah Jahan obsequiously, remaining a loyal supporter of the prince during his rebellion against his father, Emperor Jahangir. In the Battle of Tons in 1624, Khwaja Sabir's father-in-law Abdullah Khan deserted the prince, defecting to Malik Ambar, and Sabir was compelled to follow. After Malik Ambar's death, he remained in the Nizam Shahi service until the second regnal year of Shah Jahan, when he presented himself at the Mughal court. Shah Jahan bestowed a mansab of 2,000 cavalry upon him.

He participated in many military campaigns such as the Siege and conquest of Qandahar and the conquest of Daulatabad, in both of which he distinguished himself. He captured the Daulatabad fortress in 1632 and imprisoned the Niazm Shahi prince Husain Shah. For his distinguished services during the latter campaign, he was rewarded with the title of "Khan Dauran" and a mansab of 5,000. In 1631, he was appointed governor of Malwa. In 1636, Khan Dauran was dispatched to chastise Jhujhar Singh, the rebellious raja of Orchha and his son Bikramjit. He sent their heads to court, for which he received the title Bahadur.

Campaign against the Gonds of Deogarh

In 1637, Kok Shah, the Gond raja of Deogarh had defaulted in payment of tribute to the Mughals and had given safe passage to the rebel Jhujhar Singh. Hence to punish him, Khan Dauran was given permission by Shah Jahan to invade and demand payment of tribute from Kok Shah. Kok Shah refused and his stronghold of Nagpur was besieged and captured by Khan Dauran, followed by Kok Shah's surrender and payment of extra tribute. The victorious Khan-i-Dauran returned to the Emperor, with 8 lakhs of rupees levied from the Gond chiefs and others, and was extolled and given the high
title of Nusrat Jang or "Victorious in War”. He also presented 200 elephants to Shah Jahan which he had brought from Bijapur and Golconda. The presented elephants included "Gajmoti", an elephant taken from the Qutb Shahis of Golconda, considered the finest elephant in the Deccan.

Death and legacy
In the 13th regnal year of Shah Jahan's reign (1641), Khan Dauran was recalled from the Deccan due to political reasons. He then accompanied the emperor to Kashmir whence he returned to Lahore. When Khan Dauran was halted within two miles of the town in the night, he was stabbed in the belly by one of his personal attendants, a Kashmiri youth of the Brahmin caste, whom he had taken from Kashmir and converted to Islam. He was seriously wounded and had no hope of recovering. Hence he divided his property among his sons and he bequeathed the rest to the emperor. Shah Jahan ordered for his remains to be buried in the family vault at Gwalior, and gave his sons more than Khan Dauran had willed.

By the time of his death in 1645, he had been promoted to the highest imperial rank ever held by a non-royal person- 7,000 soldiers. He was of a suspicious disposition and used to treat people with great severity. He was unpopular to such an extent that when news of his death reached Burhanpur, the residents rejoiced greatly, whole shops of sweetmeats being distributed.

Further reading

References

17th-century viceregal rulers
Mughal Empire people
17th-century births
1645 deaths
Year of birth unknown